Om Thavrak (born June 25, 1985 in Cambodia) is a footballer for Cambodian Tiger FC in the Cambodian League and Cambodia national football team.

Honours

Club
Phnom Penh Crown
Cambodian League: 2008
Hun Sen Cup: 2008
Nagaworld FC
Cambodian League: 2009
Hun Sen Cup: 2013

References

External links
 

1985 births
Living people
Cambodian footballers
Cambodia international footballers

Phnom Penh Crown FC players
Association footballers not categorized by position
Angkor Tiger FC players
Nagaworld FC players